Phaedinus carbonelli is a species of beetle in the family Cerambycidae. It was described by Monné in 1999. It is named in honour of the Uruguayan entomologist Carlos S. Carbonell (1917–2019).

References

Trachyderini
Beetles described in 1999